Darwin's Nightmare is a 2004 Austrian-French-Belgian documentary film written and directed by Hubert Sauper, dealing with the environmental and social effects of the fishing industry around Lake Victoria in Tanzania. It premiered at the 2004 Venice Film Festival, and was nominated for the 2006 Academy Award for Best Documentary Feature at the 78th Academy Awards. The Boston Globe called it "the year's best documentary about the animal world."

Overview
The film opens with a Soviet-made Ilyushin Il-76 cargo plane landing on Mwanza airfield in Mwanza, Tanzania, near Lake Victoria. The plane came from Europe to ship back processed fillets of Nile perch, a species of fish introduced into Lake Victoria that has caused the extinction of hundreds of endemic species.

Through interviews with the Russian and Ukrainian plane crew, local factory owners, guards, prostitutes, fishermen and other villagers, the film discusses the effects of the introduction of the Nile perch to Lake Victoria, how it has affected the ecosystem and economy of the region. The film also dwells at length on the dichotomy between European aid which is being funneled into Africa on the one hand, and the unending flow of munitions and weapons from European arms dealers on the other. Arms and munitions are often flown in on the same planes which transport the Nile perch fillets to European consumers, feeding the very conflicts which the aid was sent to remedy. As Dima, the radio engineer of the plane crew, says later on in the film: the children of Angola receive guns for Christmas, the children of Europe receive grapes. The appalling living and working conditions of the indigenous people, in which basic sanitation is completely absent and many children turn to drugs and prostitution, is covered in great depth; because the Nile perch is fished and processed for export, all the prime fillets are sold to European supermarkets, leaving the local people to survive on the festering carcasses of the gutted fish. As to why the local fish can not be sold to the domestic market to counter the impending famine (local news reports relayed in the film indicated Northern and Central Tanzania were facing famine), one fish processing factory manager says "it is too expensive".

Reception

Critical response
Darwin's Nightmare has an approval rating of 90% on review aggregator website Rotten Tomatoes, based on 52 reviews, and an average rating of 7.56/10. The website's critical consensus states, "This eye-opening documentary brings some of the shocking effects of globalization to light". It also has a score of 84 out of 100 on Metacritic, based on 18 critics, indicating "universal acclaim".

Awards
 2004 Entrevues Film Festival (Entre vues), Audience Award
 2004 European Film Award for Best Documentary
 2004 Vienna International Film Festival, Vienna Film Award
 2005 Thessaloniki Documentary Festival, Audience Award
 2005 Angers European First Film Festival, European Jury Award
 2005 Mexico City International Contemporary Film Festival, Audience Award
 2005 Sydney Film Festival, FIPRESCI Prize
 2005 Yamagata International Documentary Film Festival, Special Jury Prize and Community Cinema Award
 2006 César Award for Best First Feature Film
 2006 Academy Awards Best Documentary Feature nominee

References

External links
 Official website
 
 
 Les ambiguïtés du Cauchemar de Darwin  - The ambiguity of Darwin’s Nightmare article at Africultures.net
 Révélations et impasses d’une approche radicale de la mondialisation  - Paper by Frédéric Giraut at EspacesTemps.net which assesses the scientific interest of both the movie and the critical book by François Garçon

2004 films
2004 documentary films
Environment of Tanzania
French documentary films
Mwanza
Documentary films about environmental issues
Austrian documentary films
Films set in Tanzania
Films directed by Hubert Sauper
European Film Awards winners (films)
Best First Feature Film César Award winners
2000s French films